Gravity: Original Motion Picture Soundtrack is the soundtrack album of the 3D science fiction thriller film Gravity, written by British film composer Steven Price. The album was released in 2013 via WaterTower Music label.

Price's score was universally applauded by film critics and audiences alike, leading Price to win and receive nominations for several Best Original Score awards at ceremonies, including a BAFTA Award, a Satellite Award and an Academy Award, as well as a Golden Globe Award nomination.

Development

Composer Steven Price was originally called in to help out for three weeks on the music design of Gravity. After having a creative discussion with director Alfonso Cuarón, Price began coming up with a template of sounds and noises that eventually led to him being hired as the film's composer. As work began on the film's score, Cuarón and Price set ground rules for distancing the score from conventional Hollywood-style action scores such as omitting the use of percussion. "Ordinarily in an action film you're often competing with explosions and god knows what else, whereas with this [movie] music could do things a different way," said Price. "With everything we did we would try and look beyond the normal way of doing things. [For] some of the action sequences where there are explosions, I knew that [...] those explosions had to be inherent."

The score was recorded in small groups or single instruments as opposed to a collective orchestra in order for each sound to be electronically processed and mixed individually to create a layered and surrounding effect.

Reception

Steven Price's score has been acclaimed by critics and audiences alike, in particular for its two final tracks, "Shenzou" and "Gravity". It was nominated for and won multiple awards in the Best Original Score category at several ceremonies: it received a nomination for Best Original Score at the 71st Golden Globe Awards and won Best Original Music at the 67th British Academy Film Awards and Best Original Score at the 86th Academy Awards. James Southall of Movie Wave awarded the album five stars out of a possible five and said that "it feels like the most intelligent and most satisfying score for a science fiction movie since Ennio Morricone's stunning, dishearteningly lambasted Mission to Mars."

Accolades

Track listing

Notes
"Airlock" is actually not played during the film. The beginning of "Aningaaq" is instead used in the scene it was intended for.
"Shenzou" includes a spelling mistake as the spacecraft is called Shenzhou.

Credits and personnel
Credits adapted from AllMusic and from the liner notes of Gravity: Original Motion Picture Soundtrack.

 Performers and musicians

Philip Collin – organ
Katherine Ellis – vocals
Haley Glennie-Smith – vocals
Lisa Hannigan – vocals
Alasdair Malloy – glass harmonica
Metro Voices – choir
Will Schofield – cello soloist
Vicci Wardman – principal viola

 Technical personnel

Geoff Alexander – conductor
Robin Baynton – assistant music editor
Christopher Benstead – music editor
Paul Broucek – executive in charge of music
David Butterworth – orchestration
Gareth Cousins – score mixer, recording engineer
Alfonso Cuarón – producer
George Drakoulias – music supervisor
Andrew Dudman – engineer
Isobel Griffiths – orchestra contractor
David Heyman – executive producer
Martin Hollis – assistant engineer
Toby Hulbert – assistant engineer
Lewis Jones – assistant engineer
Matt Jones – assistant engineer
Joe Kearns – assistant
Jason Linn – executive in charge of music
Lisa Margolis - music business affairs
Charlotte Matthews – orchestra contractor
Everton Nelson – orchestra leader
Jenny O'Grady – choir master
Sam Okell – engineer
Steven Price – composer, primary artist, producer
Nicki Sherrod – executive in charge of music
Sandeep Sriram – art direction
Jill Streater – music preparation
Christian Wright – mastering

References

2013 soundtrack albums
Science fiction film soundtracks
WaterTower Music soundtracks
Scores that won the Best Original Score Academy Award